Julie Campbell Tatham (June 1, 1908 – July 7, 1999) was an American writer of children's novels, who also wrote for adults, especially on Christian Science. As Julie Campbell she was the creator of the Trixie Belden series (she wrote the first six) and the Ginny Gordon series. As Julie Tatham she also took over the Cherry Ames series and Vicki Barr series from Helen Wells.

Biography
Julie Campbell was born on June 1, 1908 in Flushing, New York, United States. She was the seventh of ten children of Julia deFres (Sample) and Archibald Campbell, an Army general, she also was a granddaughter of an Army general.

On March 30, 1933, she married Charles Tatham Jr, and had two sons. In the 1940s, she created under her maiden name two series for Whitman Publishing Co, the Ginny Gordon series and the popular Trixie Belden series, continued by other writers under the pseudonym Kathryn Kenny. Under her married name, she also wrote some books of Helen Wells's series: Cherry Ames and Vicki Barr. She wrote during over 10 years before retiring.

Julie Tatham died on July 7, 1999 in Alexandria, Virginia, at the age of 91.

Bibliography

As Julie Campbell

Ginny Gordon Series
The Disappearing Candlesticks (1948)
The Missing Heirloom (1950)
The Mystery At the Old Barn (1951)
The Lending Library (1954)
The Broadcast Mystery (1956)

Trixie Belden Series
The Secret of the Mansion (1948)
The Red Trailer Mystery (1950)
The Gatehouse Mystery (1951)
The Mysterious Visitor (1954)
The Mystery Off Glen Road (1956)
The Mystery in Arizona (1958)

Rin Tin Tin's Stories
Rinty (1954)

As Julie Tatham

Cherry Ames Series
10. At Spencer (1949)
11. Night Supervisor (1950)
12. Mountaineer Nurse (1951)
13. Clinic Nurse (1952)
14. Dude Ranch Nurse (1953)
15. Rest Home Nurse (1954)
16. Country Doctor's Nurse (1955)

Vicki Barr Flight Stewardess Series
5. The Clue of the Broken Blossom (1950)
6. Behind the White Veil (1951)
7. The Mystery at Hartwood House (1952)

As Julie C. Tatham

Single novels
The Mongrel of Merryway Farm (1952)

Non-fiction
The Old Testament Made Easy (1985)

As Julie Campbell Tatham

Single novels
World Book of Dogs (1953)
To Nick from Jan (1957)

References and sources

See also
The Julie Campbell page on Trixie-Belden.com

1908 births
1999 deaths
American fiction writers